Richard Butchins is a British filmmaker. He has worked as presenter and director of arts and current affairs documentaries, and as an investigative filmmaker, for television programmes such as BBC One's Panorama, Channel 4's Dispatches and ITV's Exposure. Having had an arm paralysed by polio as a child, and through also being neuro-diverse Butchins "uses his own experience as a disabled person to make work which addresses disability".

His controversial and independently made, The Last American Freak Show won the 2010 Merit Award at the Superfest International Disability Film Festival and the Best Director Award at the Moscow Breaking Barriers festival. His collaboration with four non-verbal autistic artists in Osaka Japan, The Voice of the Unicorn won the 2018 Sheffield Doc/Fest Alternate Realities Interactive Award.

Filmography
The Last American Freakshow (More4, 2008) – produced and directed by Butchins
Britain on the Sick (Channel 4, 2012) – Dispatches
NHS Out of Hours Undercover (ITV, 2015) – Exposure
Nursing Homes Undercover (BBC One, 2016) – Panorama
The Great Benefits Row Dispatches (Channel 4, 2016)
The Voice of the Unicorn (2018) – a multi-disciplinary collaboration between Butchins, Kazuyo Morita, Yasuyuki Ueno, Mami Yoshikawa and Koji Nishioka.
Witness Intimidation Revealed: Stitches for Snitches (Channel 4, 2018) – Dispatches
 Dwarfs In Art: a New Perspective (BBC Four, 2018)
The Disordered Eye (BBC Four, 2020)
The Million Pound Disability Payout (BBC One, 2020) – Panorama
Targeted: The Truth About Disability Hate Crime (BBC Two, 2021)
 The Truth About Disability Benefits (Channel 4, 2021)

Awards
 2008: Best Director, Moscow Breaking Barriers Film Festival
2010: Merit Award, Superfest International Disability Film Festival, for The Last American Freak Show
2013: Medical Journalists Association awards, Commended, for Britain on the Sick
2018: Sheffield Doc/Fest Alternate Realities Interactive Award, for The Voice of the Unicorn
 2022: Winner, British Journalism Awards: Personal Finance Journalism category
2022: Winner, Disability journalist of the year, Scope Disability Awards

References

External links

British documentary filmmakers
Living people
Date of birth missing (living people)
Place of birth missing (living people)
Year of birth missing (living people)